Dariusz Tomasz Michalczewski (born 5 May 1968) was a German-Polish  professional boxer who competed from 1991 to 2005. He held multiple world championships in two weight classes, including the WBA, IBF, WBO and lineal light heavyweight titles between 1994 and 2003, and the WBO junior-heavyweight title from 1994 to 1995. BoxRec currently ranks him No.63 in its ranking of the greatest pound for pound boxers of all time.

Amateur career
Michalczewski came up through Poland's state-run sports program as a boy and had a successful amateur career. He achieved an amateur record of 139–11–2 (89 KO). Highlights of his amateur career include:

1986 – European Junior Semi-Finalist in middleweight division, defeating Fabrice Tiozzo but losing to Ray Close
1990 – German National Champion in light heavyweight division
1991 – European Champion in light heavyweight division

Defection to Germany
On 24 April 1988, while competing beyond the Iron Curtain in West Germany for the Polish national team, Michalczewski defected from the amateur team to stay in West Germany. Becoming a citizen of the now united Germany in 1991 and turning professional the same year, he was soon signed by Universum Box-Promotion, one of the leading boxing promoters in Europe. His aggressive style earned him the nickname "Tiger".

Professional career
Michalczewski turned professional in September 1991. He won the German International light-heavyweight title early on 13 February 1993, a title for foreign-born fighters based in Germany. He then won the IBF Intercontinental title on 22 May 1993.

Two-weight world champion
On 10 September 1994, Michalczewski, at 23-0 (18 KOs), captured the WBO light-heavyweight title with a 12-round decision over defending champion Leeonzer Barber at Sporthalle, Alsterdorf, Hamburg, Germany. Between then and March 2003, Michalczewski made 23 successful defenses of his WBO title against 20 different boxers, and picked up three other belts along the way. Three months after beating Barber, he won the WBO cruiserweight title with a tenth-round knockout of Nestor Giovannini. However, he soon gave up that title to continue campaigning as a light-heavyweight.

In 1996, Universum Box-Promotion's conditioning coach Fritz Sdunek became head coach and replaced Chuck Talhami as Michalczewski's trainer, which resulted in a marked improvement in Michalczewski's performances.

Hill vs Michalczewski unification
On 13 June 1997, he defeated Virgil Hill over 12 rounds to add Hill's WBA, IBF and Lineal light-heavyweight titles to his own. However, Michalczewski soon lost both alphabet titles; Scandalously, the WBA immediately stripped him for displaying its belt along with that of the WBO. Michalczewski was then forced to relinquish the IBF title when he was unable to defend the title in a court-ordered defense against mandatory challenger William Guthrie within a little over a month after the bout with Hill.

After beating Hill, Michalczewski knocked out 14 consecutive opponents, all in defense of his Lineal/WBO titles. In 1998, he defeated Drake Thadzi, in 1999, he defeated Montel Griffin, and in 2000, he defeated Graciano Rocchigiani.

Going for Marciano's record

Michalczewski had a perfect record of 48-0 when he faced Julio César González of Mexico in defense of his title on 18 October 2003. Coming into the fight, he was within one victory of tying Rocky Marciano's record of 49 wins with no losses. A win also would have put him just one victory short of Joe Louis' all-time record for successful defenses at any weight class. However, as when Larry Holmes went for the same record against Michael Spinks, the now 35-year-old Michalczewski was unable to pull it off. He lost a split decision to the 27-year-old Gonzalez at the Color Line Arena in Hamburg, and his career record dropped to 48-1.

Despite the loss, he still holds the record for the most consecutive successful world title defenses at light-heavyweight.

Final fight
In October 2004, it was announced that Michalczewski would come out of retirement to box France's Fabrice Tiozzo for the WBA light heavyweight title on 26 February 2005 in Hamburg. Michalczewski was stopped in six round, then he announced his retirement in May 2005.

Michalczewski was to come out of retirement to fight German boxing icon Sven Ottke in Germany in May 2008, but the bout never materialized.

In popular culture
Tiger Energy Drink is named after the famous boxer. His picture and text "Recommended by Dariusz 'Tiger' Michalczewski" appears on the cans and bottles.
Dariusz Michalczewski struck a friendship with performer Mark Wahlberg, known at the time by his stage name Marky Mark of the formation Marky Mark and the Funky Bunch. In 1995, Marky Mark released a track called "No Mercy" about his friend Dariusz Michalczewski, including excerpts in Polish from Dariusz, who also appears in the video clip shot by Frank Papenbroock. "No Mercy" appears in the album The Remix Album by Prince Ital Joe and Marky Mark, although this particular track is a solo effort by Marky Mark.
In 2006, a documentary was made by Pawel Kocambasi alias P.M.Starost. The 60-minute documentary entitled "Tiger" took part in Filmfest München and won the award for the Best Documentary at the Biberacher Filmfestspiele.

Social involvement
In 2003 Dariusz Michalczewski established foundation "Równe Szanse" (equal chances) which was aimed at supporting initiatives for youth from dysfunctional families. Since 2014 he supports the social campaign for civil union and the right for adoption by homosexual couples.

Professional boxing record

Television viewership

Germany

Poland

See also
List of light heavyweight boxing champions
List of WBA world champions
List of IBF world champions
List of WBO world champions

References

External links

Dariusz Michalczewski profile at Cyber Boxing Zone

1968 births
Living people
German male boxers
International Boxing Federation champions
Middleweight boxers
Polish defectors
Polish emigrants to Germany
Naturalized citizens of Germany
Polish male boxers
Sportspeople from Gdańsk
World Boxing Association champions
World Boxing Organization champions
World cruiserweight boxing champions
World light-heavyweight boxing champions